Boncarbo is an unincorporated community and U.S. Post Office in Las Animas County, Colorado, United States.  The ZIP Code of the Boncarbo Post Office is 81024.

History
The town of Boncarbo was established by the American Smelting and Refining Company in 1915.  Boncarbo is a corruption of the French bon carbon, meaning good coal.  The Boncarbo Post Office opened on November 15, 1917.  Most of the coal mined at Boncarbo was sent to Cokedale for coking.

Geography
Boncarbo is located at  (37.216249,-104.695587).

See also

Outline of Colorado
Index of Colorado-related articles
State of Colorado
Colorado cities and towns
Colorado counties
Las Animas County, Colorado
Spanish Peaks

References

Unincorporated communities in Las Animas County, Colorado
Unincorporated communities in Colorado
Company towns in Colorado
Populated places established in 1915